Orr: My Story is a 2013 autobiography written by Bobby Orr. Orr is a former professional hockey player who played in the National Hockey League from 1966 to 1978. Orr played for two teams: the Boston Bruins and the Chicago Blackhawks. Considered one of the greatest players of all time, Orr's career was cut short by multiple knee injuries and surgeries. Orr was enshrined in the Hockey Hall of Fame in 1979 at age 31, the youngest to be inducted into the Hall at that time. Orr is also known for being one of the first major sports figures to use an agent. Tragically, at the end of his career, Orr discovered that the agent, Alan Eagleson, had embezzled most of his money, leaving him deeply in debt.

On November 3, 2013, the book debuted at the #8 position on The New York Times best seller list for non fiction.

Book Summary
The book focuses on four major parts of Orr's life.

Early years. Orr was born in Parry Sound, Ontario, Canada on March 20, 1948. His parents were Doug Orr and Arva (Steele) Orr. One of five children, Orr began playing hockey at an early age and impressed his coaches with his skating ability. Originally used as forward, one of his early coaches, Bucko McDonald, moved Orr to defense and taught Orr an important lesson: "...never get rid of the puck when you can control it. Hold on to it and let the play open up in front of you." During Orr's teenage years, it was not unusual for NHL teams to recruit young players; Orr was recruited by multiple teams trying to sign him when he turned 14 as that was the minimum allowed under NHL rules. Orr eventually signed with the Boston Bruins whose scout Wren Blair, had aggressively pursued Orr and his parents. At the time of his signing, Orr was in the eighth grade. His first contract, signed in 1962, was for $1,000 and included the purchase of a used car for his father and a new suit for Orr. Once under contract with the Bruins, Orr played for the Oshawa Generals of the Canadian Metro Junior A League. Orr's debut as a professional came when he was still 14 years of age, playing with and against other players who were as old as 20. For his first season, Orr lived away from home and returned to see his parents and siblings only on weekends. Orr spent four years playing for the Oshawa team. In 1966, when he turned 18, he was invited to the Bruins training camp where he was given an opportunity to join the team for the regular season.
NHL career. Although Orr states that he "... was far from a shoo-in to make the team" he ended the training camp as a member of the Bruins, and was assigned the number "4" jersey to wear. Despite the fact that the team had a losing record for the 1966-1967 season, Orr was awarded the Calder Memorial Trophy for being the NHL's top rookie. It was during his rookie season, that problems in his left knee developed after he was hit during a game by Marcel Pronovost of the Toronto Maple Leafs. The Bruins, as a team, were improving quickly and made the playoffs the two following years. Subsequently they won the 1969-1970 season Stanley Cup on Mother's Day May 10, 1970 when Orr score the winning goal in overtime.  As he scored, he was launched in the air after being tripped by St. Louis Blues player Noel Picard. Ray Lussier's photograph of Orr, flying through the air with his hands and stick raised in victory is considered one of the most famous sports images ever captured on film. Orr would lead the Bruins to a Stanley Cup again in 1972. While both the team and Orr were experiencing great success, Orr's knee was causing considerable pain. Orr begins the eighth chapter of his book by stating "There is no way to recognize the beginning of the end.". By the mid-70s, despite a troublesome knee that was causing him to play in more pain every game, Orr seemed to be at the peak of his career and the height of his earnings potential. However, when his contract ended in 1975, Eagleson told Orr that because of his troublesome knee the Bruins were not willing to pay him what he was worth and advised Orr to become a free agent. Orr followed Eagleson's advice and, acting on Eagleson's recommendation, eventually signed with the Blackhawks. Orr, however was no longer able to play at his former level and spent most of his career with the Blackhawks watching from the bench. By October 1978, Orr realized that his career was over and announced his retirement.
Relationship with Alan Eagleson. Orr devotes an entire chapter of his book to Alan Eagleson. Their relationship began in 1964 when Orr was 16 years old and was attending a banquet with his parents celebrating a baseball championship. Orr was a member of the championship team that had invited Eagleson, then a member a lawyer and member of the Canadian Parliament, to provide an after dinner speech. In his book, Orr recalled how well Eagleson "...could speak to a room and sway people to his way of seeing things." After the dinner, Orr's parents met with Eagleson. Eventually, Orr's parents hired Eagleson as their son's agent an event that began a relationship that lasted until 1979. During those years Eagleson played a major role in every aspect of Orr's life, especially his finances. Their relationship began to unravel when Orr left the Bruins, signed with the Blackhawks and then found out that Eagleson had not been truthful with him regarding the offer the Bruins had made in an attempt to keep Orr in Boston. In the spring of 1979, Orr ended both their business and their personal relationship. It was then that Orr discovered that he had no money and that Eagleson could not account for the funds that had been entrusted to him by Orr.
"It is tough to summarize a person like Alan Eagleson in just a few words. He appears to me to have been someone who, above all else, was driven by greed. That word greed always seems to come up in any conversation you have with people who knew the man. He always wanted more and it didn't seem to matter how he accumulated it, or at whose expense it came."   

Retirement and the state of the game. After his retirement from the game, Orr worked as a consultant for the Blackhawks and later as a commentator for the Canadian Broadcasting Corporation's Hockey Night In Canada. Eventually, Orr determined that he wanted to work on behalf of players and became an agent for Bob Woolf's sports group in Boston.  Subsequently, Orr established his own agency, the Orr Hockey Group. In the book's final chapter Orr offers his thoughts on the "State of the Game" and emphasizes that coaches and parents should allow greater freedom for young people in playing hockey so that they can enjoy the game.  Orr also criticizes the year round training programs that many young hockey players are forced to participate in and laments that they are not allowed to further themselves as athletes. By comparison, Orr recalls how much he enjoyed playing summer baseball in Canada because it allowed him to learn to new skills and make new friends. Finally, Orr offers advice to the NHL. He criticizes the current emphasis on offense which has opened up the game and led to a faster style of play which he believes has resulted in greater injuries, especially concussions.

Reviews
Critics have faulted the book for not revealing new information and for not disparaging, with the exception of Eagleson, any former players, coaches or associates. 
 
"Make no mistake, this is no barbed tell-all, but then that isn’t Orr’s style. For most fans there will be little that will surprise, but some of the details are likely to delight."

"... I think most readers, and most of his fans, would find [the book] surprising and perhaps even a little disappointing. It is a book as dull as he was creative, as plodding as he was fast, as conservative as he was liberal in the way that he played the game."

"This autobiography, by no means a tell-all, does nothing to disturb his gentlemanly image. The wonder here is that the famously reticent Orr has chosen to tell anything. He has harsh words only for his former agent Alan Eagleson, who bilked him of all the money he made in hockey, for out-of-control youth coaches and for pushy parents who rob children of the simple fun of playing the game. Otherwise, Orr has nothing but good to say about his parents, siblings, neighbors and coaches who taught him respect and responsibility as a youth in Canada ... Orr skips lightly over his own on-ice achievements, dwelling only on the hard work and practice it took to become Bobby Orr, his abiding passion for hockey (including some observations on the state of today’s game) and his love for the small town of his boyhood and the big city where he became a legend. Strictly for fans of the hockey great.

References 

2013 non-fiction books
Sports autobiographies
Ice hockey books
Canadian autobiographies
G. P. Putnam's Sons books